The former L. Richardson Memorial Hospital, also known as Americas Health Care of Greensboro Nursing Facility, is a historic hospital located at Greensboro, Guilford County, North Carolina. The original section was built in 1927, and is a three-story, seven bay, Mission Revival style stuccoed brick building with a two-bay wide, three-story, brick wing constructed in 1930.  A long two- and three-story addition was added in 1945–1946.  It was Greensboro's first modern hospital for African-Americans. The hospital moved to a new facility in 1966, and the old building sold for use as a nursing home.

It was listed on the National Register of Historic Places in 1992.

References

African-American history of North Carolina
Hospital buildings on the National Register of Historic Places in North Carolina
Mission Revival architecture in North Carolina
Hospital buildings completed in 1927
Buildings and structures in Greensboro, North Carolina
National Register of Historic Places in Guilford County, North Carolina
Historically black hospitals in the United States